Calliostoma pellucidum  (pellucid top shell) is a species of medium-sized sea snail, a marine gastropod mollusc in the family Calliostomatidae, the calliostoma top snails.

Description
The height of the shell varies between 29 mm and 50 mm. The solid, conical shell is imperforate. Its color is yellowish with a few brown obliquely longitudinal streaks, and closely minutely dotted with brown and white on the numerous closely beaded lirae which encircle the whorls. These lirae number about 8-10 on the penultimate whorl, and the same number on the last above the periphery. But owing to the frequent intercalation of lirulae between them, the number is subject to variation. Just at or just below the periphery there is a group of lirulae, closer and smaller than those of the upper surface. The rest of the base is regularly granose-lirate. The spire is longer and more elevated than in Calliostoma punctulatum, and more concave in outline. The apex is acute. The sutures are very slightly impressed. There are about nine, flattened whorls. The body whorl is subangular at the periphery. The rhomboidal aperture is iridescent inside. The columellar margin is arcuate, with a slight tubercle at its base.

Distribution
This marine species occurs off New Zealand.

References

External links

Further reading 
 Powell A. W. B., New Zealand Mollusca, William Collins Publishers Ltd, Auckland, New Zealand 1979 

pellucidum
Gastropods of New Zealand
Gastropods described in 1846